The Armistice of Erzincan (also spelled Erzindzhan or Erzinjan) was an agreement to suspend hostilities during World War I signed by the Ottoman Empire and Transcaucasian Commissariat in Erzincan on 18 December 1917 (5 December O.S.). The armistice brought temporary peace to the Caucasian and Persian Fronts until 12 February, when the fighting was resumed.

The status of the Transcaucasian Commissariat was unclear at the time: the Ottomans regarded it as an independent entity, a legal successor of the Russian Empire, while the Commissariat still considered itself a part of the Russian Republic. The Ottoman Empire was already party to the Brest-Litovsk armistice with Russia (15 December) that covered the Caucasian and Persian Fronts. After receiving a ceasefire proposal from Vehib Pasha, commander of the Ottoman Third Army, the Commissariat authorised the commander of the Russian Caucasus Front, General Przhevalski, to negotiate an armistice with his Ottoman opposite. The result was the Erzincan Armistice, after which the Russian troops began to withdraw, leaving the Transcaucasian Commissariat completely undefended.

A supplement to the armistice was signed on the same day, demarcating the line of occupation between the two sides. On 12 February, Ottoman forces began advancing across the line in defiance of the armistice, having rejected the Transcaucasian Commissariat's authority to sign it and accused the Armenians of massacring Muslims behind the Ottoman line on 15–16 January. On 24 February the Brest-Litovsk armistice was broken by Germany and became of no effect. Both armistices were superseded by the Treaty of Brest-Litovsk with Russia, signed on 3 March 1918, and the Treaty of Batum with the successor states of the Transcaucasian Commissariat, signed 4 June.

References

Treaties concluded in 1917
Treaties entered into force in 1917
Erzincan
1917 in the Ottoman Empire
World War I treaties
History of Erzincan
Soviet Union–Turkey relations
December 1917 events
Ottoman Empire in World War I
Treaties of the Ottoman Empire